Felder is a surname, and may refer to:

Persons
 Amanda Felder, American professional triathlete
 Andreas Felder (b. 1962), Austrian championship ski jumper
 Cajetan Freiherr von Felder (1814–1894), Austrian entomologist, jurist, and politician
 Clarence Felder (b. 1938), American film and television character actor
 Don Felder (b. 1947), American rock musician
 Giovanni Felder (b. 1958), Swiss mathematician
 John Myers Felder (1782–1851), American politician and congressman
 Josef Felder (1900–2000), German politician
 Kay Felder, American professional basketball player
 Marcel Felder (b. 1984), Uruguayan tennis player
 Mike Felder (b. 1961), American professional baseball player
Paul Robert Felder (b. 1985), American mixed martial artist
 Richard Felder (b. 1939), American engineering educator
 Rudolf Felder, Austrian entomologist
 Simcha Felder (contemporary), American politician, representative of Brooklyn on the New York City Council
 Wilton Felder (1940–2015), American musician, saxophonist, and bass player

See also
 Feld

German-language surnames